Blue Period may refer to:
Picasso's Blue Period, the work of Pablo Picasso between 1901 and 1904
Blue Period (album), by Miles Davis, 1953
Blue Period (manga), by Tsubasa Yamaguchi, 2017
"Blue Period" (song), by The Smithereens, 1990